Maurolicus kornilovorum is a species of ray-finned fish in the genus Maurolicus. It lives in the Western Indian Ocean.

References 

Fish described in 1993
Sternoptychidae